Patrick Wright  is a British writer, broadcaster and academic in the fields of cultural studies and cultural history. He was educated at the University of Kent and Simon Fraser University in British Columbia, Canada.

He is Professor (emeritus) of Literature, History and Politics at King's College London, having previously worked at the Institute of Cultural Analysis of Nottingham Trent University, and as a fellow of the London Consortium. In the 1980s he worked for the National Council for Voluntary Organisations in London, and was self-employed as a writer, broadcaster and occasional consultant between 1987 and 2000. He has written for many journals and newspapers, including The Guardian, where he was a contracted feature writer in the early 1990s. More recently, he has held a Mellon Fellowship at Tate Britain and, together with Timothy Hyman, curated a major Stanley Spencer exhibition. He presented a BBC2 series The River, about the River Thames, in 1999. Patrick Wright is a former presenter of Radio 3's arts programme Night Waves. He is also known for his work on British heritage.

He is the author of several books, many of which explore themes connected to England and Englishness, Psychogeography and cultural history, including The Village That Died for England and A Journey through Ruins: The Last Days of London. His latest book, The Sea View Has Me Again: Uwe Johnson in Sheerness, explores the East German writer Uwe Johnson and his unexpected residence on the Isle of Sheppey between 1974 and his death in 1984, taking his appreciation of "backwaters" as the basis for a consideration of deindustrialisation and its more recent consequences in England and elsewhere. It is published in December 2020 by Repeater Books.

Bibliography
On Living in an Old Country (1985; revised and augmented edition 2009)
A Journey through Ruins: The Last Days of London (1991; revised and augmented edition 2009)
The Village That Died for England (about Tyneham; 1995; revised and augmented edition 2002)
The River: The Thames in Our Time (1999)
Tank: The Progress of a Monstrous War Machine (2000)
Stanley Spencer (2001) with Timothy Hyman
Iron Curtain: From Stage to Cold War (2007)
Passport to Peking: A Very British Mission to Mao's China (2010)
The Sea View Has Me Again: Uwe Johnson in Sheerness (2020, Repeater Books)

References

External links
 Official Home Page
2010 interview

Academics of Nottingham Trent University
British historians
British writers
Year of birth missing (living people)
Living people
Academics of King's College London
British broadcasters
Alumni of the University of Kent
Simon Fraser University alumni
The Guardian journalists